HyperSpace is an instant-on Linux-based operating system that has been developed by Phoenix Technologies. It is an application environment that can run either independently or side-by-side with a traditional operating system such as Red Hat Linux. Users are able to boot their personal computers in seconds and immediately browse the Internet and perform other Web-based activities. HyperSpace's connectivity features automatically jump on the best network and are said to be automatically configured. Phoenix executives say this allows mobile PCs to work more like smartphones.

In January 2009, Asus announced HyperSpace would be incorporated into its next-generation notebooks. Hyperspace was re-launched at the 2009 Consumer Electronics Show. The company later announced that HyperSpace has been optimized for the Cortex-A8 ARM processor architecture.

In June 2010, it was announced that HP has arranged to purchase HyperSpace from Phoenix Technologies.

Overview
HyperSpace includes instant-on/instant-off access to applications, a power savings management system, and a secure environment less prone to viruses, malware and other external attacks that generally target Windows. Users still have access to their most-used applications, such as a Web browser and e-mail, even when Windows or another OS is booting, shutting down, on standby, or has crashed. It can also be used to avoid the security problems associated with using the Windows operating system, or for troubleshooting Windows.

HyperSpace can also extend a notebook battery life by 25%. Potential applications for HyperSpace include Web browsers, instant-on multimedia players, IP soft phones, e-mail, instant messaging, VoIP, remote system maintenance, repair, and embedded security. The operating system will be read-only memory-based and as such may only apply to motherboards which have this operating system embedded.

It runs on top of the HyperCore hypervisor.

Hybrid versus Dual
HyperSpace Hybrid allows a platform to run multiple operating systems (OS) and applications as independent, side-by-side environments. This means one computer system can concurrently run both a Windows and a HyperSpace environment. Users have the ability to switch between the two environments in real time with one simple push of the 'F4' key.

HyperSpace Hybrid runs on PCs with Intel Vanderpool Technology (VT). For those without this technology, HyperSpace Dual allows the HyperSpace environment to coexist with another operating system, but the two may not run concurrently.

Partnerships
CyberLink

See also
 Splashtop
 Latitude ON
 Coreboot

References

External links
HyperSpace

Embedded Linux distributions
HP software
Linux distributions